Michael Roger Lewis Cockerell (born 26 August 1940) is a British broadcaster and journalist. He is the BBC's most established political documentary maker, with a long, Emmy award-winning career of political programmes spanning television and radio.

Early life

His father was Professor Hugh Anthony Lewis Cockerell, OBE, Secretary General of the Chartered Insurance Institute, a professor who was an expert on insurance law, and his mother, Fanny, was an author and playwright, and daughter of Dr David Salomon Jochelman, a prominent leader of the British Jewish community. He was educated at Kilburn Grammar School and Corpus Christi College, Oxford where he studied Philosophy, Politics and Economics (BA 1962, MA 1968).

Career

Cockerell joined the BBC Africa service and for 12 years he was a reporter on the current affairs programme, Panorama; he now specialises in in-depth documentaries on the politics of Westminster. He has made biographical profiles of Margaret Thatcher (The Making of the Iron Lady, 2008), Edward Heath (Sir Ted: A Film Portrait of Edward Heath, 2005), Alan Clark, Barbara Castle, Roy Jenkins (A Very Social Democrat: A Portrait of Roy Jenkins, 1996), Michael Howard, David Cameron, Denis Healey (The Best Prime Minister Labour Never Had?, 2015) and most recently, Boris Johnson (The Irresistible Rise).

From the 1970s onwards, his work for television has included How We Fell For Europe (1975), The Lost World of the Seventies (2012), The Marketing of Margaret Thatcher (1983), Blair's Thousand Days – The Lady and the Lords (2000), Life in Whips Office (1995), Inside 10 Downing Street (2000) and Cabinet Confidential (2001).

He has also made multi-part series', among them the How to Be trilogy (How to Be Chancellor, 2010, How to Be Foreign Secretary, 1998 and How to Be Home Secretary, 1999); a three-part series on the history of Anglo-American, Anglo-German and Anglo-French relations; an observational documentary on the workings of Alastair Campbell's press office in News from Number 10; and a three-part analysis of Tony Blair's 10 years in office as Prime Minister. He also followed up the How to Be series, with How to Be Ex Prime Minister (2007), broadcast just before Blair's resignation. The programme was repeated upon the departure from office of Theresa May in 2019.

Cockerell's 2010 series The Great Offices of State was a behind-the-scenes look at the Home Office, the Foreign Office, and the UK Treasury, three of the UK's Great Offices of State. This was followed by the 2011 series The Secret World of Whitehall. He also made the four-part series Inside the Commons for the BBC, broadcast in 2015, for which had sought permission for six years.

In the run-up to the May 2010 election, Cockerell was responsible for a documentary entitled How to Win the TV Debate, in which he discussed the importance of Britain's first television debates in the outcome of the general election. The programme featured candid interviews with US presidents and their advisers on debate strategy.

Cockerell has interviewed eight Prime Ministers – more than any other reporter in British political broadcasting. Prior to the invasion of Iraq in 2003, he interviewed Tony Blair for a documentary on Britain's relationship with the United States, Hotline to the President. That interview was widely reported on the front pages of British newspapers when Blair accepted that the need to sustain the transatlantic 'special relationship' meant a willingness to 'pay the blood price'.

More recently, Cockerell has contributed shorter profiles to Newsnight, such as Who is Ed Miliband? and Theresa May's legacy. He was awarded an honorary doctorate by the University of East Anglia in 2007.

Family
Cockerell has been married three times and has seven children.

He first married Anne Christine Adriane Faber (1944–28 November 2002) in 1970, and divorced 1981. Faber was the eldest child and only daughter of Julian Faber and his wife Lady Caroline Faber (née Macmillan), a daughter of Harold Macmillan. They had one son and one daughter.

His second marriage, in 1984, was to Bridget Alexandra Heathcoat-Amory (born 21 May 1952), daughter of Brigadier Roderick Heathcoat-Amory and his wife Sonia Myrtle Heathcoat-Amory (née Denison). By 1991, they had divorced.

In 2011, he married BBC producer Anna Lloyd, with whom he has three daughters;, the couple live in Notting Hill.

Notes

External links
Journalisted – Articles by Michael Cockerell

British male journalists
Fellows of Corpus Christi College, Oxford
1940 births
Living people
People educated at Kilburn Grammar School